Ministry of Science, Technology and Innovation (MINCYT) of Argentina is a ministry of the national executive power that oversees the government's scientific and technological policy. It oversees decentralized research and development dependencies such as the National Scientific and Technical Research Council (CONICET), the National Agency for the Promotion of Research, Technological Development and Innovation (Agencia I+D+i), the National Space Activities Commission (CONAE) and the National Genetic Data Bank.

The Ministry was created in 2007 by decree of then-President Cristina Fernández de Kirchner; matters of science and technological development had previously been part of the Ministry of Education's portfolio. The current minister of science and technology is Daniel Filmus, who assumed office in 2021 under President Alberto Fernández.

List of ministers

References

External links
 

Government ministries of Argentina
Science and technology ministries
Scientific organisations based in Argentina
Government agencies established in 2007
2007 establishments in Argentina